Tom Harmon (July 20, 1937 – June 14, 1995), credited as Timothy Scott or Tim Scott, was an American actor.

Personal life
Scott was born in Detroit, Michigan, lived in New Mexico, and moved to Los Angeles, California, in 1959 for his acting career. He had a wife Donna Leigh Scott, one stepdaughter Marisa Scott-Windom, and two sons, Scott Harmon and Dean Swope. Scott co-founded the Met Theatre with James Gammon in Los Angeles. He lived in Woodland Hills where he was undergoing treatment for lung cancer.

Career
Scott appeared in nearly two dozen films and television, including many westerns. He was part of the supporting cast of Footloose (1984) playing the part of Andy who ran the town mill. He portrayed Texas Ranger turned cowboy Pea Eye Parker in the 1989 miniseries Lonesome Dove and its 1993 sequel Return to Lonesome Dove. He was replaced by Sam Shepard as Pea Eye in Streets of Laredo (1995).  He also appeared in films, like Butch Cassidy and the Sundance Kid (1969), Fried Green Tomatoes (1991), Vanishing Point (1971), and The Electric Horseman (1979), and television, like 1966 series Batman and miniseries Ned Blessing: The True Story of My Life.

Death
He died of a heart attack in Los Angeles at age 57. Scott was commemorated in Los Angeles and Texas. He was cremated, his ashes scattered at screenwriter Bill Wittliff's ranch, Plum Creek, located between two Texas cities, Luling and Gonzales.

Selected filmography
Sources:
Butch Cassidy and the Sundance Kid (1969), William "News" Carver
Vanishing Point (1971), Angel
The Electric Horseman (1979), Leroy
Lonesome Dove (1989), "Pea Eye" Parker
Fried Green Tomatoes (1991), Smokey Lonesome
Ned Blessing: The Story of My Life and Times (1992), Deputy Sticks Packwood
Return to Lonesome Dove (1993), "Pea Eye" Parker

References

External links
 

1937 births
1995 deaths
20th-century American male actors